is an area located in Kami Town, Mikata District, Hyōgo Prefecture, Japan.

As of 2012, the area has an estimated population of 2,200. The total area is 66.16 km2.

Ojiro is mostly a mountainous area and prides itself as the homeland of Wagyu cattle. Ojiro is designated as one of The Most Beautiful Villages in Japan, and is the birthplace of Tajiri-go, a Tajima Cattle who is the ancestor of more than 99.9% of Japanese Black wagyu.

Ojiro lies entirely within the San'in Kaigan Global Geopark.

The area of Ojiro was a town of Mikata. On April 1, 2005, town of Mikata, along with the town of Kasumi, and the town of Muraoka, was merged to create the town of Kami. At that time the portion of Kami that was Mikata renamed as Ojiro-ku (小代区), or Ojiro Ward, because some residents requested to use the traditional place name "Ojiro".

Attractions
 Amagasaki City Mikata Highland Outdoor Learning Center
 Ancient Times Experience Forest (小代古代体験の森)
 Kusube Valley (久須部渓谷)
 Kaname no taki Falls
 Sandan no taki Falls
 Mikata Snow Park (ミカタスノーパーク)
 Niiyahattandaki Falls
 Ojiro Health Park (ground golf course)
 Ojiro Shrine
 Ojiro Ski Place (おじろスキー場)
 Ojiron Onsen and Spa (おじろん)
 Tajima Cattle
 Rice Terraces of Ueyama (うへ山の棚田): 100 Best Rice Terraces of Japan
 Yoshitaki Camping Park
 Yoshitaki Waterfalls (吉滝)

Annual events
 February: Mikata Highland Snow Festival
 May: Rhododendron Park Festival
 May: Ojiro Valley Festival
 June: Mikata ZANKOKU (Cruel) Marathon (みかた残酷マラソン全国大会)
 August: Furusato Ojiro Summer Festival
 August: Bon dances in each settlements
 September: Ojiro Sports Festival
 October: Autumn festivals in each settlements
 November: "The Most Beautiful Village in Japan" Ojiro Festival

Transportation

Bus
Akioka Line operated by Zentan Bus company from Yōka Station. It spends about 1 hour.

Major roads
 Route 482

References

External links
 Ojiro Tourism Association official website 
 Ojiro (Kami Town, Hyogo), Snow Japan
 Small is Wonderful: OJIRO, the homeland of Wagyu cattle (Facebook page)

Tourist attractions in Hyōgo Prefecture
Geography of Hyōgo Prefecture
Places of Scenic Beauty
Kami, Hyōgo (Mikata)